Cameron Lachlan McAuslan (born 1 June 1998) is a Hong Kong cricketer.

McAuslan is based in New Zealand and attended Otago Boys' High School in Dunedin, being part of their 1st XI squad that finished third in The Secondary School Boys’ First XI Cup in December 2016. He was selected in the Hong Kong squad for 2017 Desert T20 Challenge. He made his One Day International (ODI) debut against Scotland on 22 January 2017.

He made his first-class debut for Hong Kong against Papua New Guinea in the 2015–17 ICC Intercontinental Cup on 29 November 2017.

In August 2018, he was named in Hong Kong's squad for the 2018 Asia Cup Qualifier tournament. Hong Kong won the qualifier tournament, and he was then named in Hong Kong's squad for the 2018 Asia Cup. In November 2019, he was named in Hong Kong's squad for the 2019 ACC Emerging Teams Asia Cup in Bangladesh.

References

External links
 
 

1998 births
Hong Kong cricketers
Hong Kong One Day International cricketers
Living people
People educated at Otago Boys' High School